Onix may refer to:

 ONIX (publishing protocol), XML metadata formats for book publishers
 Onix (Pokémon), a  character in the Pokémon franchise
 Chevrolet Onix, a subcompact car
 Onix, a synonym of the legume genus Astragalus

People 
 Onix Cortés (born 1988), judoka from Cuba
 Onix Concepción (born 1957), Puerto Rican Major League Baseball shortstop

See also
 Onyx (disambiguation)
 P-800 Oniks, a Russian/Soviet supersonic anti-ship cruise missile